Palladius (fl. AD 408–431; died  457/461) was the first bishop of the Christians of Ireland, preceding Saint Patrick. It is possible that some elements of their life stories were later conflated in Irish tradition. Palladius was a deacon and member of one of the prominent families in Gaul. Pope Celestine I consecrated him a bishop and sent him to Ireland "to the Scotti believing in Christ".

Armorica
The Palladii were thought to be amongst the most noble families of Gaul, and several of them held high ranks in the Church of Gaul. Palladius was the son of Exuperantius of Poitiers, of whom the contemporary pagan poet Rutilius Claudius Namatianus wrote on his 416 voyage: "Then on the eve of going I send back to his studies and the city Palladius, the hope and honour of my race. That eloquent youth had been sent of late from the lands of the Gauls to learn the laws of the Roman courts. My son in affection and kinsman by blood, he holds the fondest ties of my regard. Even now his father Exuperantius trains the Armoric sea-board to love the recovery of peace; he re-establishes the laws, brings freedom back and suffers not the inhabitants to be their servants' slaves."  Exuperantius was apparently praefectus praetorio Galliarum ("Praetorian prefect of the Gallic provinces") when he was killed in an army mutiny at Arles in 424.

Palladius was married and had a young daughter. He is described as a friend and younger kinsman by Namatianus. In Rome, he kissed his family goodbye in the manner of the Apostles, and lived as an ascetic in Sicily around 408/409, giving his daughter to a convent on that island. He seems to have been ordained as a priest around 415. He lived in Rome between 418–429, and appears to be the "Deacon Palladius", responsible for urging Pope Celestine I to send the bishop Germanus to Britain, where he guided "the Britons back to the Catholic faith."

Prosper of Aquitaine describes Palladius as a deacon. Butler and P.F. Moran say that Palladius was a  Deacon of Rome, as it is unlikely that a deacon of Auxerre would exercise the influence in Rome that many have assigned to Palladius; and that it is in accordance with St Prosper's usage to indicate the Roman deacon by the simple title "diaconus." Historian Kathleen Hughes regards it as more probable that he was a deacon of St Germanus, and that Germanus sent him to Rome, where he received a commission from the Holy See for Germanus to travel to Britain in response to a request from the bishops there for assistance in combatting Pelagianism.

Ireland
In 431, "Palladius, having been ordained by Pope Celestine, is sent as first bishop to the Scotti believing in Christ", according to the Chronicle of Prosper of Aquitaine. Palladius landed at Arklow. Auxilius, Secundinus, and Iserninus are missioners identified with St. Patrick, but more recent research associates them not with Patrick but with Palladius.

Irish writers who chronicled the life of St Patrick state that St Palladius preached in Ireland before St Patrick, although he was soon banished by the King of Leinster, and returned to North Britain. According to Muirchu (who lived two centuries later) in the Book of Armagh, God hindered him...and neither did those fierce and cruel men receive his doctrine readily, nor did he himself wish to spend time in a strange land, but returned to him who sent him. Palladius was accompanied by four companions: Sylvester and Solinus, who remained after him in Ireland, and Augustinus and Benedictus, who followed him to Britain but returned to their own country after his death. Palladius is most strongly associated with Leinster, particularly with Clonard, County Meath.

Scotland
According to Muirchu, Palladius arrived among the Scots in North Britain after he left Ireland.  Scottish church tradition holds that he presided over a Christian community there for about 20 years. A cluster of dedications in the Mearns in Scotland, in the village of Auchenblae, are believed to mark his last resting place. As late as the reign of James V, royal funds were disbursed for the fabrication of a new reliquary for the church there, and an annual "Paldy Fair" was held at least until the time of the Reformation.

Death
His date of death is unknown; however, the Annals of Ulster contain the following references:
 457 "Repose of the elder Patrick, as some books state"
 461 "Here some record the repose of Patrick"
 492 "The Irish state here that Patrick the Archbishop died."
 493 "Patrick... apostle of the Irish, rested on the 16th day before the Kalends of April..."

Thus, it is possible that later writers confused Palladius and Patrick. If the earlier dates of 457/461 indeed refer to him, then it seems that the actual St Patrick died much later about 492/493. Patrick's mission was largely confined to Ulster and Connacht, while Palladius seems to have been active in Leinster, particularly in the area around Clonard.

The Vita tripartita states that he died at Cell Fine (thought to be modern-day Killeen Cormac, County Kildare), where he left his books, writing tablet and relics of Peter and Paul. Alban Butler, citing Hector Boethius and Camden, says that he died at Fordun, fifteen miles south of Aberdeen, around the year 450.

See also

Secundinus

Notes

Bibliography
 "New light on Palladius?", Peritia iv (1986), pp. 276–83.
 
 Vita tripartita Sancti Patricii (MS).

Further reading

5th-century births
5th-century deaths
5th-century Irish bishops
5th-century Christian saints
Medieval Irish saints
Gallo-Roman saints
5th-century writers